Paul Pisasale is a former mayor of the City of Ipswich in Queensland, Australia, and convicted extortionist. Pisasale was mayor of Ipswich from 2004 to 2017, making him  one of Queensland's longest-serving mayors, and was last elected in 2016 with 83.45% of the popular vote.  He resigned as mayor in 2017 following a raid on his office by the Queensland Crime and Corruption Commission. He was subsequently charged with corruption in 2017. He was committed to stand trial on a number of other charges in 2019, including charges of sexual assault where he was accused of "unlawfully and indecently" assaulting an Ipswich woman, and charges of perjury. Pisasale subsequently pleaded guilty to these charges which included two counts of sexual assault, official corruption, unlawful drug possession, 27 counts of fraud, secret commission by an agent, and fraud of property.

Criminal convictions
Pisasale was convicted of two counts of extortion on 24 July 2019 where he was found to have impersonated a private investigator as part of a plot to unlawfully obtain $10,000 from another individual. His appeal against those convictions was dismissed in March 2020.

Pisasale later pleaded guilty to a range of additional charges including perjury, fraud, corruption, and sexual assault. His criminal behaviour was described as "systematic corruption and failings" whereby Pisasale "exploited and manipulated" his position in the Council including the commission of sexual assault offences within his former official chambers.

Pisasale was initially sentenced to two years in jail to be suspended after 12 months for his extortion offences, and commenced his sentences at the Wolston Correctional Centre, where he was admitted to hospital from an exercise-related injury within days of his incarceration. He was sentenced to an additional seven and a half years in jail for the crimes he admitted in 2020, and will be eligible for parole in October 2022.

Honors and other awards 
In 2010, Pisasale was awarded the title of "Queensland Local Hero" by the National Australia Day Council.

2012 saw Pisasale receive the Queensland Civil Justice Award for going beyond the call of duty in the 2011 floods.

In 2013, he was also awarded a Life Sciences award for championing master-planned communities, job creation, protection of the environment and being an advocate for education by Life Sciences Queensland, an industry-led organisation which works with government and industry.

References 

1951 births
Living people
Mayors of Ipswich, Queensland
Politicians convicted of corruption
Australian fraudsters
Australian perjurers
Australian politicians convicted of crimes
Australian politicians convicted of fraud